Hugh Owen may refer to:

Politicians
 Sir Hugh Owen, 1st Baronet (1604–1670), Member of Parliament (MP) for Pembroke, Haverfordwest and Pembrokeshire
 Hugh Owen (MP for Bossiney) (fl. 1563–1571), MP for Bossiney and Merioneth
 Sir Hugh Owen, 2nd Baronet (1641 creation) (1645–1699), MP for Pembrokeshire
 Sir Hugh Owen, 5th Baronet (1731–1786), MP for Pembrokeshire
 Sir Hugh Owen, 6th Baronet (1782–1809), MP for Pembroke
 Sir Hugh Owen Owen, 2nd Baronet (1803–1891), MP for Pembroke, 1826–1838, 1861–1868

Others
 Hugh Owen (cricketer) (1859–1912), English cricketer
 Hugh Owen (educator) (1804–1881), Welsh educator
 Hugh Owen (minister) (1639/40–1700), Welsh independent minister
 Hugh Owen (photographer) (1808–1897), British photographer
 Hugh Owen (topographer) (1761–1827)

See also 
 Huw Owen (1926–1996), Welsh theologian, writer and academic